Alina Rotaru-Kottmann (born 5 June 1993) is a Romanian long jumper.

At the 2009 World Youth Championships she won the silver medal in long jump and finished fourth in the high jump. She was knocked out in the qualification at the 2010 World Junior Championships, but won the silver medal at the 2010 Summer Youth Olympics.

She finished fifth at the 2012 World Junior Championships, fourth at the 2013 Jeux de la Francophonie and seventh at the 2014 European Championships. She also competed at the 2012 European Championships and the 2013 European Indoor Championships without reaching the final.

Her personal best jump is 6.91 metres, achieved in June 2019 in Rheinau.

International competitions

References

External links 

 
 
 

1993 births
Living people
Romanian female long jumpers
Romanian female high jumpers
Athletes (track and field) at the 2010 Summer Youth Olympics
World Athletics Championships athletes for Romania
Athletes (track and field) at the 2016 Summer Olympics
Olympic athletes of Romania
Universiade medalists in athletics (track and field)
Universiade gold medalists for Romania
Sportspeople from Bucharest
Medalists at the 2017 Summer Universiade
Athletes (track and field) at the 2020 Summer Olympics